St Patrick's, Donabate GAA is a Gaelic Athletic Association club in Donabate, County Dublin, Ireland.

Club history

Prior to 1924, Gaelic football was played in Donabate and Portrane by the Stars of Fingal.  In 1924 a new club was formed which took the name of the patron saint of the parish, Saint Patrick.

One of the highlights of the club's history was the winning of the club's first Dublin Junior Football Championship in 1980, a feat repeated in 2008.  More recently in the club's history it achieved 3 league promotions in a row from 2011 to 2014. Most notably winning Division 2 of the Dublin Adult Football League for the first time in 2013.

2021 Was a momentous year for the club, as it saw its men's first team win the Dublin Intermediate Football Championship for the first time in the clubs history. It would see them play Senior Championship for the first time ever, in 2022

Facilities
The club's playing pitches are located in Robbie Farrell Park, Ballymastone, Donabate, Co Dublin.  Great progress has been made in recent years through the establishment of a capital development fund.  "Capital Club 250" encourages members to donate €21 per month, i.e. €250 per year, for the specific purpose of developing the club's facilities.  In recent years, the club has flourished with the acquisition of a new field which has been made playable and which holds "Pitch 3" as well as a large training area.  Using Capital Club 250 donations, the club has raised sufficient "own funding" to be in a position to apply for Government grant aid.  Additionally, the concept of the Capital Club 250 came to the attention of a benefactor who, impressed by the spirit of community collaboration and joint initiative, offered an interest-free loan to the club to facilitate further investment.  These sources of funding allowed the club to invest in a "sand base" under Pitch 2.  State-of-the-art floodlighting was also installed around Pitch 2.  The latest project has just commenced and will see the construction of an "All-Weather Astro Training Area" which will be completed in Autumn of 2018.  The project will cost close to €400,000 and would not have been possible without the generous donations of the Capital Club 250 members.  More investment is planned over the coming years to prepare for the anticipated growth of the population on the peninsula.  As well as providing access to Gaelic games, where children "play to learn", adolescents "learn to compete" and adults may "compete to win" or just have fun, our facilities will also position St Patrick's GAA to compete at the highest levels in Dublin, Leinster and, one day, Ireland.

Honours
 Dublin Intermediate Football Championship Winners 2021
 Dublin Junior Football Championship Winners 1980, 2008
 Dublin Junior (C) Football Championship Winners 2020, 2021
 Dublin AFL Division 2 Winners 2013
 Dublin AFL Div. 6 Winners 2006
 Dublin AFL Div. 10 Winners 2014
 Dublin Minor G Football Championship Winners 2011

References

External links
 Official Club Website
 Official Dublin GAA Website
 Dublin Club GAA

1924 establishments in Ireland
Gaelic games clubs in Fingal
Gaelic football clubs in Fingal
Hurling clubs in Fingal